ÑuSat satellite series (sometimes translated into English as NewSat), is a series of Argentinean commercial Earth observation satellites. They form the Aleph-1 constellation, which is designed, built and operated by Satellogic.

Overview

Satellites design 
The satellites in the constellation are identical 51 × 57 × 82 cm spacecraft of  mass. The satellites are equipped with an imaging system operating in visible light and infrared. The satellites were developed based on the experience gained on the BugSat 1 prototype satellite.

BugSat 1 
The BugSat 1 (nickname Tita) was a technology demonstration mission for the ÑuSat satellites. It was launched on 19 June 2014 by a Russian Dnepr rocket. It was a microsatellite weighing 22 kg with outer dimensions of 27.5 × 50 × 50 cm. It also carried amateur radio capabilities.

Missions 
The Aleph-1 constellation will consist of more than 300 satellites. The first two satellites were launched as piggy-back payloads on a Chinese Long March 4B rocket in May 2016 from the Taiyuan Satellite Launch Center into a 500 km Sun-synchronous orbit with an inclination of 97.5°. The third satellite was launched as a piggy-back payload on a Long March 4B launch vehicle in June 2017. The fourth and fifth satellites were launched as piggy-backs on a Long March 2D rocket in February 2018. The sixth satellite was launched on a rideshare mission on a Vega rocket in September 2020. Satellites number seven and eight were launched as piggy-backs on a Long March 2D rocket in January 2020. Satellites number 9-18 were launched on a Long March 6 launch vehicle on 6 November 2020.

Ground communications 
An U/V transponder with 2 watts of output power for 8 GHz downlink and 2 GHz uplink will be operating on 100 kHz bandwidth.

LabOSat / MeMOSat payloads 
MeMOSat, developed by the LabOSat Group, designed and built by a group of scientists at the National Atomic Energy Commission, the National Institute of Industrial Technology, the National University of General San Martín and National Scientific and Technical Research Council (CONICET).

This memory was specially designed to operate in harsh environments and adverse conditions, such as the strong radiation it must withstand in space. Its main objective is to test electronic components that will be commercialized in the future. To do this, the memory is made up of two metallic films with an oxide between about 20 nm thick, with electrical resistance properties, that can send information from the satellites, allowing to study their behavior in these hostile environments.

AMSAT payload 
Additionally, ÑuSat-1 carries a U/V linear transponder called LUSEX provided by AMSAT Argentina (AMSAT-LU) to offer services to the HAM community.

List of satellites 
Although the satellites are officially named "ÑuSat", each satellite has a nickname, a tradition from Satellogic that dates back since its very first satellite Fresco.

Gallery

See also 
 Satellogic
 Planet Labs
 Spire Global

References

External links 
 Launcher Data Release by Space Flights News
 Technical reference by Gunter's Space Page
 Alepth Constellation by China Space Flight
 Launcher Data Release by Gunter's Space Page

Spacecraft launched in 2016
Spacecraft launched in 2017
Spacecraft launched in 2018
Spacecraft launched in 2020
Spacecraft launched in 2021
Spacecraft launched in 2022
Spacecraft launched in 2023
Satellites of Argentina
Commercial Earth imaging satellites
Satellite constellations
2016 in Argentina
2017 in Argentina
2018 in Argentina
2020 in Argentina